1978 Soviet Second League was a Soviet competition in the Soviet Second League.

Qualifying groups

Group I [Northwest and Central]

Group II [Ukraine]

Group III [Volga–Russian South]

Group IV [Caucasus and Ural]

Group V [Central Asia and West Siberia]

Group VI (Kazakhstan and East Siberia)

References
 All-Soviet Archive Site
 Results. RSSSF

Soviet Second League seasons
3
Soviet
Soviet